Magirus GmbH is a truck manufacturer based in Ulm, Germany, founded by Conrad Dietrich Magirus (1824–1895). It was formerly known as Klöckner Humboldt Deutz AG, maker of the Deutz engines, so the brand commonly used was Magirus Deutz, and for a short time Klöckner. Most trucks from Magirus were also known as Magirus-Deutz. The logo of Magirus Deutz was a stylised M with a sharp, long centre point to represent the spire of Ulm Minster. 

Magirus is one of the largest manufacturers of fire fighting equipment. Its fire trucks are primarily based upon chassis and engines from Iveco, but occasionally also uses platforms from other truck manufacturers. Magirus is an Iveco Group brand.

History 
The company began manufacturing fire-fighting vehicles in 1866. In the late 1910s, it started the production of trucks and buses. These vehicles developed a reputation for high engineering standards, able to operate under the most arduous conditions. The company also invented the turntable ladder, as Magirus Leiter, which quickly became an essential item of fire brigade equipment worldwide.

Magirus had some involvement in World War 2 and The Holocaust, producing gas vans used for killing Jews. Magirus also supplied ladders for mobile V-2 Rocket launch sites.

In 1975, Magirus became part of Iveco, which continued producing some Magirus trucks for a short while under the name "Iveco Magirus" before abandoning it completely in most countries. KHD's collaboration with Fiat ended abruptly and less than harmoniously in 1979, leaving Fiat as owner of the Magirus-Deutz brand. However, Iveco trucks were sold under the Magirus brand in Germany and other European and Middle Eastern markets until the end of the 1980s.

Today, the Magirus brand is only used for the company's firefighting equipment section, not for the whole fleet of manufactured trucks.

Airship ladders
Though seldom seen today, the Magirus company produced almost all of the early, movable ladders used in the construction of large, rigid airships in Germany and the United States.  The multi-extension, wooden ladders were mounted on massively constructed, wooden carriage frames with a  fifth wheel-style, forward axle assembly.  Although it appeared to be designed for horses, the ladders could be easily moved by two men. The carriage was equipped with four, hand screw-type "outriggers" that would resist the ladder from tipping.  The ladder did not swivel on the carriage.  It was elevated and extended only towards the front of the carriage.  In the "working" position, the ladder had to be elevated to about an 80° angle  to allow full extension to 85 feet.  (The maximum extended length of the largest wooden Magirus ladder is unknown, but the ones used during the erection of the Goodyear-Zeppelin Corporation's USS Akron and USS Macon reached to 85 feet.)

They can be seen, commonly, in early photographs of airships under construction in the 1920s and 1930s.

In the Soviet Union
In 1974, the firm was awarded a contract (called the Delta Project) for delivery in 1975-1976 of about 9,500 dumper and flatbed trucks (Magirus М232 D19 and M290 D26) to the USSR to work on the construction of the Baikal–Amur Mainline (BAM). This order was the largest in the company's history. These models were export-only options KHD products which were not offered on the domestic market in Germany. By January 1, 1975, for the first batch of Magirus trucks for BAM construction was ready to be sent to the Soviet Union. Many of these trucks are still in service today. Largely because of this single order, in 1975, export products accounted for 70% of total production by Magirus-Deutz, and the firm took the second place among the German truck manufacturers.

In 1982, Magirus-Deutz erstwhile owners KHD sold the licensing rights for Soviet production of up to 25,000 Series 413 diesel engines. These were meant to be installed in heavy USSR trucks and other vehicles.

Products

Current products
 Iveco Magirus Eurocargo
 Iveco Magirus Stralis
 Iveco Magirus Trakker
 Iveco Magirus Dragon

Gallery

Timeline
1864 -  Founded by Conrad Dietrich Magirus
1872 -  1872 2-wheel hand ladder climbable when free-standing, model »Ulmer Ladder«
1892 -  First horse-pulled rotating ladder 25 m
1904 -  First steam powered self-propelled “fire engine”
1916 -  First fully automatic drive turn table ladder in the world
1917 -  Production of Magirus motor vehicles
1931 -  First turn table ladder with steel ladder set
1936 -  Fusion with Humboldt-Deutz Motorenfabrik
1951 -  Made the highest turntable ladder in the world 52 m
1953 -  First turntable ladder with hydraulic drive
1965 -  First forward control truck chassis
1971 -  First rescue vehicle RW-rail for subway and local railway operation
1972 -  First large airport crash tender
1980 -  First turntable ladder »low-design«
1986 -  First computer controlled turntable ladder
1987 -  Take over of previous Bachert production plant in Weisweil, Germany
1992 -  Iveco Mezzi Speciali, Brescia, Italy
1994 -  First articulated ladder DLK 23-12 GL CC
1996 -  Production start of light pumper vehicles in Görlitz/Germany
1997 -  Lohr-Magirus in Graz/Austria
2000 -  First oscillation-free turntable ladder (Computer Stabilized)
2005 -  „Firework of Novelties“ at the Interschutz in Hannover
2007 -  New modular bodywork generation AluFire 3
2010 -  Presentation of the models M 32 L-AT, M 33 P, SuperDragon 2, MultiStar2 at the Interschutz in Leipzig
2015 -  World's highest turntable ladder, 68 meters

See also

Fiat S.p.A.
Iveco Bus
Iveco S.p.A.
Fiat Industrial S.p.A.
Magirus Mercur

References

External links

 

Iveco
Truck manufacturers of Germany
Companies based in Ulm
Fire service vehicle manufacturers
German brands